The Twenty-eight by '28 initiative is an effort set forth by former Mayor Eric Garcetti that the City of Los Angeles complete 28 transportation infrastructure projects before the start of the 2028 Summer Olympics on  and the 2028 Summer Paralympics the following month. 

Most projects are funded through Measure R and Measure M and will receive accelerated priority, though several more were proposed by this plan. In December 2018, the Los Angeles County Metropolitan Transportation Authority stated it would need $26.2 billion to complete the list of projects.

List

Notes

References
General

Inline

Los Angeles Metro Rail projects
Passenger rail transportation in California
Public transportation in Los Angeles County, California
Transportation in Los Angeles
2028 Summer Olympics
Eric Garcetti
2028 in transport